Nawab Bahadur Sir Khwaja Ahsanullah KCIE (22 August 1846 – 16 December  1901) was the third Nawab of Dhaka. He also authored books in Persian and Urdu under the pen name of Shaheen. Ahsanullah is recognised for his philanthropic works in Bengal, most notably his donations to the present Bangladesh University of Engineering and Technology.

Early life
Ahsanullah was born in 1846 as the son of Khwaja Abdul Ghani and Ismatun Nesa. As a young child he learned Urdu, Arabic and Persian in addition to the Islamic education of Quran, Hadith, and Fiqh. He was noted as being a very gifted child, and mastered the religious Islamic doctrine at a very young age. By age 22, he handled the maintenance and expansion of the family estates.

Literature
Ahsanullah wrote widely in Urdu under the pen name Shaheen and much of his spare time was spent composing literature in Urdu and Persian. Those around him noted that he had a talent for composing spontaneous poetry which generally evoked sunny imagery. He published a book of Persian and Urdu poems Kulliyat-e-Shaheen which has been preserved at the University of Dhaka. He also published his diaries, titled Tarikh-e-Khandan-e-Kashmiriyah. In 1884, he started an Urdu magazine, Ahsanut Qasas, which was published in Dhaka.

Philanthropy
Ahsanullah was a noted philanthropist. He donated over 5 million rupees to various charitable projects, and renovated the mazar (mausoleum) of Pir Yemeni. He spent over 50,000 rupees on famine relief in Barisal District, Mymensingh District and Dhaka District in 1896. He also was one of the chief backers for the building of Comilla. Many hospitals were funded and constructed by him, including the Patuankali Begam Hospital, Lady Dufferin Women's Hospital, and the Mitford Hospital. He also spend 40 thousand rupees on creating an engineering college in Dhaka, which is now Bangladesh University of Engineering and Technology.

Islamic activities
Ahsanullah was an ardent advocate for Muslims. He created a number of mosques and madrasas including the Madaripur and Begambari mosques and madrassas. He also restored and rebuilt over 15 dargahs and mosques. He was a member of the Central Northern Muhammadan Association and this played a large role in his works. He was a supporter of the 1905 Partition of Bengal which his son Khwaja Salimullah facilitated.

Awards and titles
Ahsanullah was awarded a Khan Bahadur in 1871, a Nawab in 1875, a Companion of the Order of the Indian Empire (CIE) in 1891, a Nawab Bahadur in 1892, a Knight Commander of the Order of the Indian Empire (KCIE) in 1897, and a member of the Governor-General's Legislative Council in 1890 and again in 1899.

Ahsanullah was awarded many titles for his social and philanthropic work. Both he and his father were noted allies of the British Raj.

Death and legacy
Ahsanullah died on 16 December 1901 of heart failure. He was buried in the family plot in Begum Bazar in Dhaka.

Ahsanullah was married to Wahidunnesa Begum, Farhat B. Nawab Begum, Kamrunnesa Bibi (d. 1900) and Khodeja Begum (d. 1900).  His one son, Khwaja Salimullah, and a grandson, Khwaja Habibullah went on to become the 4th and the 5th nawabs of Dhaka respectively. Ahsanullah's another grandson, through his daughter Bilqis Banu, Khawaja Nazimuddin, served as the governor general (1948–1951) and the prime minister (1951–1953) of Pakistan.

References

1846 births
1901 deaths
People from Dhaka
19th-century Indian Muslims
Nawabs of Dhaka
Knights Commander of the Order of the Indian Empire
Indian knights
Urdu-language poets